The state highway system in the U.S. state of Wyoming consists of a series of numbered routes; usually known as WYO X, where X is the route number.



List

Special routes

See also

References

External links
Road Signs of Wyoming
AARoads Wyoming Highways Page

 
State highways